Addition is the mathematical process of putting things together.

Addition may also refer to:

Addition (logic), a simple logic argument form
Addition reaction, a chemical reaction combining molecules
 "Addition", a song by No Devotion from Permanence
 A room or wing added onto a building after initial construction through renovation.